A fix-up is a novel created from short fiction that may or may not have been initially related or previously published.

Fix-up may also refer to:
Frameup, in British English, providing false evidence in order to falsely prove someone guilty of a crime
Fixer-upper, a real estate property that will require repair
"Fixup" a computer science term for an object relocation table
"Fixing someone up", matchmaking, or arranging a social date for someone

Entertainment
"The Fix-Up" a 1992 episode of Seinfeld
Fix Up, a 2004 play by Kwame Kwei-Armah
"Fix Up", a song by Black Star

See also
Fixer Upper (disambiguation)